General elections were held in Cambodia on 23 March 1958. The Sangkum party received all but 409 of the 1.6 million votes, winning all 61 seats in the National Assembly.

Results

By district
Most districts only had one Sangkum candidate, but one Phnom Penh district was contested by a Pracheachon candidate.

References

Cambodia
Elections in Cambodia
1958 in Cambodia
Election and referendum articles with incomplete results